Jianye District is one of 11 districts of Nanjing, the capital of Jiangsu province, China.

History
Nanjing, once called Jianye, was the capital city of six dynasties beginning in 3AD, in large part because of its position on the Yangtze River.

Administrative subdivisions
Jianye has administrative jurisdiction over the following 6 subdistricts:

 Defunct - Binhu Subdistrict & Nanhu Subdistrict both subdistricts merged with Mochu Subdistrict that formerly part of Gulou District to form Mochouhu Subdistrict under Jianye.

The Jianye district is responsible for the administration of the following urban areas:

Transportation

Rail service is available at the Yuantong Station between Line 1 and Line 2 Line 1 service at Olympic Stadium Station, and Line 2 service at Olympic Stadium East Station, Mochouhu Station, Jiqingmendajie Station, Xinglongdajie Station, Yurundajie Station, and Youfangqiao Station of the Nanjing Metro.

Jiangxin Island may be reached via the Yingtian Street Elevated Bridge, which is a  bridges that connects the island, and its YOG Forest Park, to the mainland at the Nanjing International Expo Center, one of the sites for the 2014 Summer Youth Olympics. It is the first pedestrian bridge to cross the Yangtze.

Economy 

Everbright International has its Nanjing office in Lianqiang International Mansion in Jianye District.

See also
Education
 Nanjing Audit University

References

External links
Jianye District Government official website 

County-level divisions of Jiangsu
Districts of Nanjing